Nuutti Tykkyläinen (born 19 July 1999) is a Finnish professional footballer who plays as a left-back for Kakkonen club JIPPO.

Club career

JIPPO
Tykkyläinen is a product of JIPPO. Due to injuries in the JIPPO-squad, Tykkyläinen got his official debut for the club on 12 July 2015 against FC Myllypuro in the Kakkonen at the age of 16. Despite his young age, Tykkyläinen made a total of 13 appearances in the league in that season.

KuPS
In January 2016, Tykkyläinen was signed by Veikkausliiga club KuPS, where he was supposed to play for their KuPS' farmer club KuFu-98, while still training with KuPS. Tykkyläinen played for both the U-19 team of KuPS and KuFu-98 in his first three years at the club.

Tykkyläinen got his official debut for KuPS on 19 January 2018 in the Finnish Cup against Musan Salama. Tykkyläinen did also make his debut in the Veikkausliiga on 12 August 2018 against PS Kemi Kings.

Return to JIPPO
On 2 September 2019, Tykkyläinen returned to JIPPO on a loan deal for the rest of the season. He made a permanent return to JIPPO at the end of the season.

PK-35
In January 2022, Tykkyläinen moved to fellow league club PK-35 on a deal for the 2022 season.

Third spell at JIPPO
At the end of December 2022 JIPPO confirmed, that Tykkyläinen would return to the club for the 2023 season.

References

External links
 

1999 births
Living people
Finnish footballers
Association football defenders
JIPPO players
Kuopion Palloseura players
SC Kuopio Futis-98 players
PK-35 Vantaa (men) players
Kakkonen players
Veikkausliiga players
Ykkönen players
People from Joensuu
Sportspeople from North Karelia